In G Major is a ballet made for New York City Ballet's Ravel Festival by ballet master Jerome Robbins to the composer's Piano Concerto in G Major (1928–31). The premiere took place May 15, 1975 at the New York State Theater, Lincoln Center, with lighting by Mark Stanley. The Paris Opera Ballet commissioned scenery and costumes by Erté when it staged Robbins' ballet under the name En Sol, decor which has subsequently been borrowed by City Ballet. Ravel composed the concerto after travelling in the United States and is reported to have described the work as "... written in very much the same spirit as those of Mozart and Saint-Saëns," and said that "it uses certain effects borrowed from jazz, but only in moderation."

Original cast
Suzanne Farrell 
Peter Martins

Footnotes

References 

  
Playbill, NYCB, Thursday, May 15, 2008 
 
Repertory Week, NYCB, Spring season, 2008 repertory, week 3

Articles  
NY Times, Deirdre Carmody, May 16, 1975

Reviews  
NY Times, Clive Barnes, May 16, 1975

Ballets by Jerome Robbins
Ballets to the music of Maurice Ravel
1975 ballet premieres
New York City Ballet repertory
New York City Ballet Ravel Festival